Gary Gullock (born 1 March 1958) is an Australian Olympic medal winning rower.

In 2010 Gullock was inducted as a member of the Rowing Victoria Hall of Fame.

References 
 
 

1958 births
Living people
Australian male rowers
Rowers at the 1984 Summer Olympics
Olympic silver medalists for Australia
Olympic medalists in rowing
World Rowing Championships medalists for Australia
Medalists at the 1984 Summer Olympics
20th-century Australian people